Craddock Moor Stone Circle or Craddock Moor Circle is a stone circle located near Minions on Bodmin Moor in Cornwall, UK. It is situated around half a mile Northwest of The Hurlers (stone circles).

Description
The circle consists of sixteen fallen stones with one remaining possible stump, all considerably overgrown making it one of the harder circles to find on the moor. John Barnatt has suggested that the circle was situated so that the summit of Brown Willy marked the midsummer sunset.

It is nearby to Craddock Moor stone row and an embanked enclosure. Christopher Tilley noted what he called a "possible axis of movement" linking the stone row, an embanked enclosure, the circle and the Hurlers. As these cannot be seen from each other, he commented "It is difficult to imagine how such a striking alignment could occur purely by chance."

Archaeology
One of the first archaeological surveys of Bodmin Moor, including Craddock Moor Circle was carried out c. 1800 by Nicholas Johnson and Peter Rose.

Folklore
Chris Barber and David Pykitt suggested that Craddock Moor is named after the ancient British King of Arthurian legend Caradoc who has been linked to the Pendragon Caractacus who fought the Romans.

Literature

References

External links

Cornwall's Archaeological Heritage - field guide to accessible sites - Craddock Moor stone circle
Illustrated entry in the Megalithic Portal
Illustrated entry in the Modern Antiquarian
Pastscape - English Heritage entry about Craddock Moor Stone Circle

Bodmin Moor
Stone circles in Cornwall